John Craig Venter (born October 14, 1946) is an American biotechnologist and businessman. He is known for leading one of the first draft sequences of the human genome and assembled the first team to transfect a cell with a synthetic chromosome. Venter founded Celera Genomics, the Institute for Genomic Research (TIGR) and the J. Craig Venter Institute (JCVI). He was the co-founder of Human Longevity Inc. and Synthetic Genomics. He was listed on Time magazine's 2007 and 2008 Time 100 list of the most influential people in the world. In 2010, the British magazine New Statesman listed Craig Venter at 14th in the list of "The World's 50 Most Influential Figures 2010". In 2012, Venter was honored with Dan David Prize for his contribution to genome research. He was elected to the American Philosophical Society in 2013. He is a member of the USA Science and Engineering Festival's advisory board.

Early life and education
Venter was born in Salt Lake City, Utah, the son of Elizabeth and John Venter. In his youth, he did not take his education seriously, preferring to spend his time on the water in boats or surfing.
 According to his biography, A Life Decoded, he was said never to be a terribly engaged student, having Cs and Ds on his eighth-grade report cards. Venter considered that his behavior in his adolescence was indicative of attention deficit hyperactivity disorder (ADHD), and later found ADHD-linked genetic variants in his own DNA. He graduated from Mills High School in Millbrae, California. His father died suddenly at age 59 from cardiac arrest, giving him a lifelong awareness of his own mortality. He quotes a saying: "If you want immortality, do something meaningful with your life." 

Although he opposed the Vietnam War, Venter was drafted and enlisted in the United States Navy where he worked as a hospital corpsman in the intensive-care ward of a field hospital. He served from 1967 to 1968 at the Naval Support Activity Danang in Vietnam. While in Vietnam, he attempted suicide by swimming out to sea, but changed his mind more than a mile out.
Being confronted with severely injured and dying marines on a daily basis instilled in him a desire to study medicine, although he later switched to biomedical research.

Venter began his college education in 1969 at a community college, College of San Mateo in California, and later transferred to the University of California, San Diego, where he studied under biochemist Nathan O. Kaplan. He received a Bachelor of Science in biochemistry in 1972 and a Doctor of Philosophy in physiology and pharmacology in 1975 from UCSD.

Career
After working as an associate professor, and later as full professor, at the State University of New York at Buffalo, he joined the National Institutes of Health in 1984.

EST controversy
While an employee of the NIH, Venter learned how to identify mRNA and began to learn more about those expressed in the human brain. The short cDNA sequence fragments he was interested in are called expressed sequence tags, or ESTs.  The NIH Office of Technology Transfer and Venter decided to take the ESTs discovered by others in an attempt to patent the genes identified based on studies of mRNA expression in the human brain.  When Venter disclosed this strategy during a Congressional hearing, a firestorm of controversy erupted. The NIH later stopped the effort and abandoned the patent applications it had filed, following public outcry.

Human Genome Project

Venter was passionate about the power of genomics to transform healthcare radically. Venter believed that shotgun sequencing was the fastest and most effective way to get useful human genome data. The method was rejected by the Human Genome Project however, since some geneticists felt it would not be accurate enough for a genome as complicated as that of humans, that it would be logistically more difficult, and that it would cost significantly more.

Venter viewed the slow pace of progress in the Human Genome project as an opportunity to continue his interest in patenting genes, so he sought funding from the private sector to start Celera Genomics. The company planned to profit from their work by creating genomic data to which users could subscribe for a fee. The goal consequently put pressure on the public genome program and spurred several groups to redouble their efforts to produce the full sequence. Venter's effort won him renown as he and his team at Celera Corporation shared credit for sequencing the first draft human genome with the publicly funded Human Genome Project.

In 2000, Venter and Francis Collins of the National Institutes of Health and U.S. Public Genome Project jointly made the announcement of the mapping of the human genome, a full three years ahead of the expected end of the Public Genome Program. The announcement was made along with U.S. President Bill Clinton, and UK Prime Minister Tony Blair. Venter and Collins thus shared an award for "Biography of the Year" from A&E Network.
On 15 February 2001, the Human Genome Project consortium published the first Human Genome in the journal Nature, followed one day later by a Celera publication in Science. Despite some claims that shotgun sequencing was in some ways less accurate than the clone-by-clone method chosen by the Human Genome Project, the technique became widely accepted by the scientific community.

Venter was fired by Celera in early 2002. According to his biography, Venter was fired because of a conflict with the main investor, Tony White, specifically barring him from attending the White House ceremony celebrating the achievement of sequencing the human genome.

Global Ocean Sampling Expedition
The Global Ocean Sampling Expedition (GOS) is an ocean exploration genome project with the goal of assessing the genetic diversity in marine microbial communities and to understand their role in nature's fundamental processes. Begun as a Sargasso Sea pilot sampling project in August 2003, Venter announced the full Expedition on 4 March 2004. The project, which used Venter's personal yacht, Sorcerer II, started in Halifax, Canada, circumnavigated the globe and returned to the U.S. in January 2006.

Synthetic Genomics

In June 2005, Venter co-founded Synthetic Genomics, a firm dedicated to using modified microorganisms to produce clean fuels and biochemicals. In July 2009, ExxonMobil announced a $600 million collaboration with Synthetic Genomics to research and develop next-generation biofuels. 
Venter continues to work on the creation of engineered diatomic microalgae for the production of biofuels.

Venter is seeking to patent the first partially synthetic species possibly to be named Mycoplasma laboratorium. There is speculation that this line of research could lead to producing bacteria that have been engineered to perform specific reactions, for example, produce fuels, make medicines, combat global warming, and so on.

In May 2010, a team of scientists led by Venter became the first to create successfully what was described as "synthetic life". This was done by synthesizing a very long DNA molecule containing an entire bacterium genome, and introducing this into another cell, analogous to the accomplishment of Eckard Wimmer's group, who synthesized and ligated an RNA virus genome and "booted" it in cell lysate. The single-celled organism contains four "watermarks"
written into its DNA to identify it as synthetic and to help trace its descendants. The watermarks include 
 Code table for entire alphabet with punctuations
 Names of 46 contributing scientists
 Three quotations
 The secret email address for the cell.

On March 25, 2016, Venter reported the creation of Syn 3.0, a synthetic genome  having the fewest genes of any freely living organism (473 genes).  Their aim was to strip away all nonessential genes, leaving only the minimal set necessary to support life.
This stripped-down, fast reproducing cell is expected to be a valuable tool for researchers in the field.

In August 2018, Venter retired as chairman of the board, saying he wanted to focus on his work at the J. Craig Venter Institute. He will remain as a scientific advisor to the board.

J. Craig Venter Institute
In 2006 Venter founded the J. Craig Venter Institute (JCVI), a nonprofit which conducts research in synthetic biology. It has facilities in La Jolla and in Rockville, Maryland and employs over 200 people.

In April 2022 Venter sold the La Jolla JCVI facility to the University of California, San Diego for $25 million. The university, which already has a very strong genomics program, hopes to absorb most of the Institute's faculty and its current research grants. Venter will continue to lead a separate nonprofit research group, also known as the J. Craig Venter Institute, and stressed that he is not retiring.

Individual human genome
On September 4, 2007, a team led by Sam Levy published one of the first genomes of an individual human—Venter's own DNA sequence. Some of the sequences in Venter's genome are associated with wet earwax, increased risk of antisocial behavior, Alzheimer's and cardiovascular diseases. This publication was especially interesting because it attempted to separate the two haplotypes (the two copies of each chromosome), although it only accomplished this in a limited way. The genome as published only had 3 billion bases, rather than the full 6 billion that would compose a fully diploid sequence. Another 10 years passed before the first haplotype-resolved human genomes began to appear.

The Human Reference Genome Browser is a web application for the navigation and analysis of Venter's recently published genome. The HuRef database consists of approximately 32 million DNA reads sequenced using microfluidic Sanger sequencing, assembled into 4,528 scaffolds and 4.1 million DNA variations identified by genome analysis. These variants include single-nucleotide polymorphisms (SNPs), block substitutions, short and large indels, and structural variations like insertions, deletions, inversions and copy number changes.

The browser enables scientists to navigate the HuRef genome assembly and sequence variations, and to compare it with the NCBI human build 36 assembly in the context of the NCBI and Ensembl annotations. The browser provides a comparative view between NCBI and HuRef consensus sequences, the sequence multi-alignment of the HuRef assembly, Ensembl and dbSNP annotations, HuRef variants, and the underlying variant evidence and functional analysis. The interface also represents the haplotype blocks from which diploid genome sequence can be inferred and the relation of variants to gene annotations. The display of variants and gene annotations are linked to external public resources including dbSNP, Ensembl, Online Mendelian Inheritance in Man (OMIM) and Gene Ontology (GO).

Users can search the HuRef genome using HUGO gene names, Ensembl and dbSNP identifiers, HuRef contig or scaffold locations, or NCBI chromosome locations. Users can then easily and quickly browse any genomic region via the simple and intuitive pan and zoom controls; furthermore, data relevant to specific loci can be exported for further analysis.

Human Longevity, Inc.
On March 4, 2014, Venter and co-founders Peter Diamandis and Robert Hariri announced the formation of Human Longevity, Inc., a company focused on extending the healthy, "high performance" human lifespan. At the time of the announcement the company had already raised $70 million in venture financing, which was expected to last 18 months. Venter served as the chairman and chief executive officer (CEO) until May 2018, when he retired. The company said that it plans to sequence 40,000 genomes per year, with an initial focus on cancer genomes and the genomes of cancer patients.

Human Longevity filed a lawsuit in 2018 against Venter, accusing him of stealing trade secrets. Allegations were made stating that Venter had departed with his company computer that contained valuable information that could be used to start a competing business. The lawsuit was ultimately dismissed by a California judge on the basis that Human Longevity were unable to present a case that met the legal threshold required for a company, or individual, to sue when its trade secrets have been stolen.

Human Longevity's mission is to extend healthy human lifespan by the use of high-resolution big data diagnostics from genomics, metabolomics, microbiomics, and proteomics, and the use of stem cell therapy.

Published books
Venter is the author of two books, the first of which was an autobiography titled A Life Decoded. Venter's second book was titled Life at the Speed of Light in which he announced his theory that this is the generation in which there appears to be a dovetailing of the two previously diverse fields of science represented by computer programming and the genetic programming of life by DNA sequencing. He was applauded for his position on this by futurist Ray Kurzweil.

Personal life
After a brief marriage to Barbara Rae-Venter, with whom he had a son, Christopher, he married Claire M. Fraser remaining married to her until 2005. In late 2008 he married Heather Kowalski. They live in the La Jolla neighborhood of San Diego, CA. Venter is an atheist.

Venter was 75 when he sold his main research facility, the J. Craig Venter Institute, to UCSD in 2022. He said he has no intention of retiring and would continue to lead a separate nonprofit research group, but he was recovering from a difficult bout with COVID-19 and was tired of management responsibilities. He has a home in La Jolla and a ranch in Borrego Springs, California, as well as homes in two small towns in Maine. He indulges in two passions: sailing and flying small planes, which he calls "the ultimate freedom".

In popular culture
Venter has been the subject of articles in several magazines, including Wired, The Economist, Australian science magazine Cosmos, and The Atlantic.

Venter appears in the two-hour 2001 NOVA special, "Cracking the code of life".

On May 16, 2004, Venter gave the commencement speech at Boston University.

On December 4, 2007, Venter gave the Dimbleby lecture for the BBC in London.

Venter delivered the 2008 convocation speech for Faculty of Science honours and specialization students at the University of Alberta.

In February 2008, he gave a speech about his current work at the TED conference.

Venter was featured in Time magazine's "The Top 10 Everything of 2008" article. Number three in 2008's Top 10 Scientific Discoveries was a piece outlining his work stitching together the 582,000 base pairs necessary to invent the genetic information for a whole new bacterium.

On May 20, 2010, Venter announced the creation of first self-replicating semi-synthetic bacterial cell.

In the June 2011 issue of Men's Journal, Venter was featured as the "Survival Skills" celebrity of the month.  He shared various anecdotes and advice, including stories of his time in Vietnam, as well as mentioning a bout with melanoma on his back, which subsequently resulted in his "giving a pound of flesh" to surgery.

In May 2011, Venter was the commencement speaker at the 157th commencement of Syracuse University.

In May 2017, Venter was the guest of honor and keynote speaker at the inauguration ceremony of the Center for Systems Biology Dresden.

Awards and nominations
 1996: Golden Plate Award of the American Academy of Achievement
 1999: Newcomb Cleveland Prize
 2000: Jacob Heskel Gabbay Award in Biotechnology and Medicine
 2001: Biotechnology Heritage Award with Francis Collins, from the Biotechnology Industry Organization (BIO) and the Chemical Heritage Foundation
 2002: Association for Molecular Pathology Award for Excellence in Molecular Diagnostics
 2007: On May 10, 2007, Venter was awarded an honorary doctorate from Arizona State University, and on October 24 of the same year, he received an honorary doctorate from Imperial College London.
 2008: Double Helix Medal from Cold Spring Harbor Laboratory 
 2008: Kistler Prize from Foundation For the Future for genome research 
 2008: ENI award for Research & Environment 
 2008: National Medal of Science from President Obama
 2010: On May 8, 2010, Venter received an honorary doctor of science degree from Clarkson University for his work on the human genome.
 2011: On April 21, 2011, Venter received the 2011 Benjamin Rush Medal from William & Mary School of Law.
 2011: Dickson Prize in Medicine
 2020: Edogawa NICHE Prize  for his contribution to research and development pertaining to the Human genome

Works 
Venter has authored over 200 publications in scientific journals.

 
 
 
 
 
 
 
  editor Roger Highfield
  editor Roger Highfield

See also

 Artificial gene synthesis
 Full genome sequencing
 Genetic testing
 Genome: The Autobiography of a Species in 23 Chapters
 Personal genomics
 Pharmacogenomics
 Predictive medicine
 Synthetic Organism Designer

References

Further reading

External links

Human Longevity, Inc.
HuRef Genome Browser
J. Craig Venter Institute
Sorcerer II Expedition
Synthetic Genomics 
The Institute for Genomic Research (TIGR)

 Media

Cracking the code to life, The Guardian, October 8, 2007
Craig Venter interview, Wired Science, December 2007 (video)
Video of interview/discussion with Craig Venter by Carl Zimmer on Bloggingheads.tv
 – TED (Technology Entertainment Design) conference (video)
Webcast of Venter talk 'Genomics: From humans to the environment' at The James Martin 21st Century School
The Richard Dimbleby Lecture 2007 – Dr. J. Craig Venter – A DNA Driven World
A short course on synthetic genomics. Edge Master Class 2009

1946 births
Living people
American atheists
American chairpersons of corporations
American corporate directors
American geneticists
American technology chief executives
American technology company founders
Biotechnologists
Human Genome Project scientists
Leeuwenhoek Medal winners
Life extensionists
Members of the United States National Academy of Sciences
Military personnel from Salt Lake City
Researchers of artificial life
Scientists from Salt Lake City
United States Navy corpsmen
United States Navy personnel of the Vietnam War
University at Buffalo faculty
University of California, San Diego alumni
Members of the National Academy of Medicine